Charles Albert Creery Hardy (23 September 1843 – 29 August 1922) was an independent conservative Member of Parliament in New Zealand. 
 
He was elected to the Selwyn electorate in the 1899 general election, but was defeated in 1911, when he was a candidate for the then newly formed Reform Party.

He was appointed to the Legislative Council on 26 June 1913. At the end of his term, he was reappointed on 25 June 1920. He remained a member until his death on 29 August 1922.

He was a fern collector and showed a collection of ferns at the Ashburton Industrial Exhibition in 1880.

Notes

References

1843 births
1922 deaths
Members of the New Zealand Legislative Council
Reform Party (New Zealand) MLCs
Unsuccessful candidates in the 1911 New Zealand general election
19th-century New Zealand politicians